Ameletus subnotatus is a species of combmouthed minnow mayfly in the family Ameletidae. It is found in all of Canada, the northern, and southwestern United States.

References

Mayflies
Articles created by Qbugbot
Insects described in 1885